Little Big League is a 1994 American family sports film about a 12-year-old who suddenly becomes the owner and then manager of the Minnesota Twins baseball team. It stars Luke Edwards, Timothy Busfield, and Dennis Farina. The film is director Andrew Scheinman's first and only feature film directorial project.

Plot
Billy Heywood, the 12-year-old son of widowed Jenny, is a Little League Baseball player. Billy's paternal grandfather, Thomas Heywood, owns the Minnesota Twins.

When Thomas dies, Billy learns that he is now the owner of the Twins. Thomas' will specifies that the team executives are to help Billy until he is old enough to run the team by himself.

Billy quickly runs afoul of the team manager, George O'Farrell. Billy believes O'Farrell is too hard on the players, while O'Farrell despises the idea of working for a kid. After O'Farrell repeatedly insults Billy,  Billy fires him.

With no other managers willing to work for a kid, and with his grade-school summer break starting in two days, the baseball-savvy Billy decides to name himself the new manager. He reaches out to the Commissioner of Baseball, who approves after consulting with Jenny.

The players are very skeptical, but Billy promises that if he does not improve the team's last-place position in the standings within a few weeks, he will resign. The team quickly moves up to division race contention. Unfortunately, not all is going smoothly for Billy, as his friend and star first baseman Lou Collins takes a romantic interest in Jenny.

Billy picks up bad habits on the road, and is even ejected from a game and given a one-game "suspension" by his mother for swearing at an umpire because of a call he didn't like. He is troubled when he must release his personal favorite Twins player, Jerry Johnson, who is in the twilight of his career; Billy's awkward handling of the situation ends up making Jerry feel even worse.

The pressures of managing the team wear Billy down and consume his free time. Billy's friends do not like how his managerial responsibilities are keeping him away from being with them. Even when he's physically present (as opposed to on the road with the team), he is typically distracted by team business.

After Jenny spends her birthday with Lou rather than Billy, Billy uses Lou's minor batting-slump as an excuse to bench him, sending the Twins into a losing skid. Billy later tells his mom that he's tired of being a "grown-up" and decides to quit as manager after the end of the season, even reinstating Lou to starter on first base.

With four games left in the season, the Twins trail the Seattle Mariners by four games in the wild card race. The Twins win their last four while the Mariners lose four straight, forcing a One-game playoff at the Twins' Hubert H. Humphrey Metrodome to determine who advances to the postseason.

The two teams trade three-run home runs during the course of the game, and extra innings are required. The Mariners eventually take the lead. Down to their final out, and Lou about to go up to bat, he tells Billy that he has asked Jenny to marry him, and that her reply was "Ask Billy". With a runner on base, Billy says if Lou hits the game-winning homer he will give his blessing, but quickly relents and gives Lou his consent whether or not he hits a homer. Facing Randy Johnson, Lou hits a long fly ball to center field, but Ken Griffey Jr. makes a leaping catch at the wall to rob Lou of a homer and end the game.

With their season over, Billy tells the players he is officially stepping down as manager, with pitching coach Mac MacNally taking his place, as well as bringing back Jerry Johnson to be the third base coach and new hitting instructor. The players object to losing Billy, but he reminds the team that he will still be present as the owner, and says that he might come back as manager if junior high doesn't work out. When being informed that none of the fans have left, Billy, along with the rest of the team, returns to the field to receive a standing ovation.

Cast

MLB personalities as themselves 

Actor Kevin Elster was an active MLB player when the film was shot, while two of his fictional Twins teammates were played by former MLB players Leon Durham and Brad Lesley. John Gordon, who plays the fictional announcer Wally Holland, was the actual radio announcer for the Twins from 1987 through 2011, and was elected into the club's Hall of Fame in 2016.

Reception
The film has a score of 33% on Rotten Tomatoes, based on 18 reviews. On Metacritic, the film has a score of 57 out of 100 based on 20 reviews, indicating "mixed or average reviews". In his three-and-a-half star review, Roger Ebert gave the film praise for being a family movie that doesn't dumb down for its audience or feel predictable.

Year-end lists 
 Honorable mention – David Elliott, The San Diego Union-Tribune

References

External links
 
 
 

1994 films
1990s sports comedy films
American baseball films
American children's comedy films
American sports comedy films
Castle Rock Entertainment films
Columbia Pictures films
Films scored by Stanley Clarke
Films about families
Films set in Minnesota
Films shot in Minnesota
Minnesota Twins
Seattle Mariners
1994 directorial debut films
1990s English-language films
1990s American films